Marta Jaskulska (born 25 March 2000) is a Polish professional racing cyclist, who currently rides for UCI Women's WorldTeam . In August 2020, Jaskulska won the under-23 title at the Polish National Time Trial Championships.

References

External links
 

2000 births
Living people
Polish female cyclists
Place of birth missing (living people)
Cyclists at the 2018 Summer Youth Olympics
21st-century Polish women